Josh Groban is the debut studio album by singer Josh Groban. The track "You're Still You" charted at No. 10 on the Billboard Hot Adult Contemporary Tracks chart, and "To Where You Are" charted at No. 1 on the same chart. As of October 2015, the album has sold 5.2 million in the U.S.

Track listing

Notes
  signifies an additional producer

Charts

Weekly charts

Year-end charts

Certifications

References

External links
 
 

2001 debut albums
Josh Groban albums
Albums produced by David Foster
143 Records albums
Reprise Records albums
Albums produced by Richard Marx
Albums produced by Rhys Fulber